Angelina Michshuk (born May 1, 1988) is a Kazakhstani sport shooter. She won a bronze medal in the women's skeet at the 2012 Asian Shooting Championships in Doha, Qatar, with a total score of 91 targets, earning her a spot on the Kazakhstan team for the Olympics.

Michshuk represented Kazakhstan at the 2012 Summer Olympics in London, where she competed in the women's skeet. She placed ninth in the qualifying rounds of her event by one point ahead of French shooter and two-time Olympian Veronique Girardet, with a total score of 66 targets.

References

External links
NBC Olympics Profile

1988 births
Living people
Kazakhstani female sport shooters
Skeet shooters
Olympic shooters of Kazakhstan
Shooters at the 2012 Summer Olympics
People from Shymkent
Shooters at the 2010 Asian Games
Shooters at the 2014 Asian Games
Universiade medalists in shooting
Universiade bronze medalists for Kazakhstan
Asian Games competitors for Kazakhstan
Medalists at the 2013 Summer Universiade
Medalists at the 2015 Summer Universiade
21st-century Kazakhstani women